Kassim Vonricco Washington (born March 20, 1980), best known by his stage name Ricco Barrino, is an American R&B singer and songwriter from High Point, North Carolina. He is also the brother of American Idol winner Fantasia Barrino and nephew of The Barrino Brothers. In 2006, he released his debut single "Bubble Gum".

In 2009, Barrino secured a recording contract with American rapper T.I.'s Grand Hustle Records. He has been featured on songs from several high-profile recording artists, including T.I.'s "Porn Star" from Paper Trail (2008), B.o.B's "5th Dimension" from The Adventures of Bobby Ray (2010) and Bone Thugs-n-Harmony's "Gone", from their reunion album Uni-5: The World's Enemy (2010).

Musical career
In 2006, after hearing an Eminem song while at a strip club, Ricco Barrino was inspired to write a song titled "Bubble Gum", which became a local hit. The song, which was officially released as Barrino's debut single by North Carolina-based independent hip hop label Othaz Records, caught the attention of Grand Hustle co-founder Jason Geter and Atlantic records. In 2006, he made an appearance on his sister Fantasia Barrino's second album, Fantasia, on the song "Bore Me (Yawn)".  In 2008, Grand Hustle label-boss T.I., featured Barrino on a song titled "Porn Star", which was included on his multi-platinum sixth album Paper Trail. In 2009, Barrino obtained his first chart placement, with the single "Futuristic Love (Elroy)", which Barrino appeared on alongside Grand Hustle newcomer Yung L.A. The single reached number 55 on US Billboard Hot R&B/Hip-Hop Songs chart. In 2010, he made appearances on his sister's reality show Fantasia for Real.

On January 12, 2012, Ricco Barrino released a mixtape titled Twenty 12 Play. The mixtape's title is a play on fellow American singer R. Kelly's 1993 album 12 Play, which Barrino considers a huge influence on his music. He released another mixtape, titled Musical Evolution, on March 28, 2013, which was made available via the iTunes Store. On March 21, 2014, Barrino released his debut extended play (EP), titled From the Club to the Crib. The EP, which spawned the single "Drift", includes production from Grand Hustle in-house producer Keith Mack. In 2015, Barrino garnered more recognition when he was featured on the single "California" by American rapper Colonel Loud, which was considered a radio hit, among many including HipHopDX, HotNewHipHop, AllHipHop, Complex and more. On June 3, 2016, Barrino released an EP titled Vibes, in collaboration with frequent collaborator Tigo B.

Discography

EPs

Mixtapes

Singles

As featured artist

Guest appearances

Music videos

As featured artist

References

External links
  Ricco Barrino: The Official Site Music of Grand Hustle Recording Artist Ricco Barrino. Web. 18 October 2010.
 
 
 
 

Living people
American soul singers
Singer-songwriters from North Carolina
People from High Point, North Carolina
American hip hop singers
American male singer-songwriters
21st-century African-American male singers
American contemporary R&B singers
Fantasia Barrino
African-American songwriters
Grand Hustle Records artists
1980 births